Dastgerd (also Romanized as Dastgird and Dastjerd) is a village in Fordu Rural District, Kahak District, Qom County, Qom Province, Iran. At the 2006 census, its population was 211, in 69 families.

References 

Populated places in Qom Province